Fred Anderson (22 May 1933 – 28 March 2012) was an Australian rugby league footballer who played in the 1950s and 1960s.

Club career

During his very long career, Fred Anderson played predominantly for Canterbury-Bankstown but also for South Sydney in the New South Wales Rugby Football League premiership. 

He had played 261 first grade games in his 16-year career.

He played with the Canterbury club for twelve seasons between 1953-1963. He then joined South Sydney for four seasons between 1964-1967. He was regarded as a champion hooker during the era when scrimmaging was an important part of the game.

Anderson played for Souths in the famous 1965 grand final against St. George in front of a record 78,000 fans at the Sydney Cricket Ground. By the time he turned 34, his career had come to an end at Souths when he was replaced in first grade by the younger Elwyn Walters in 1967.

Representative career
Fred Anderson represented New South Wales rugby league team on two occasions – 1958 and 1961 – and represented City Firsts in the former season.

He was invited to play for South Africa in 1963 in a single Test against New Zealand, although he was Australian born.

Fred Anderson died on 28 March 2012, 55 days short of his 79th birthday. He was later cremated at Woronora, Sutherland.

Career playing statistics

Point scoring summary

Matches played

References

External links
Bulldogs profile

1933 births
2012 deaths
Australian rugby league players
South Sydney Rabbitohs players
Canterbury-Bankstown Bulldogs players
South Africa national rugby league team players
Rugby league hookers
Rugby league players from Sydney
Place of birth missing